Brothers in Arms 3: Sons of War is a 2014 World War II-era third-person shooter video game developed by Gameloft with partnership with Gearbox Software and published by Gameloft. It was released on December 17, 2014, for the iOS, Android and Windows Phone. The game serves as a sequel to Brothers in Arms: Hour of Heroes and Brothers in Arms 2: Global Front and it is still set during World War II. It is part of the Brothers in Arms series.

Gameplay 

Gameplay of Brothers in Arms 3: Sons of War is similar to its predecessors, though it differs drastically from Brothers in Arms 2: Global Front. Instead, the game is played from third-person perspective like the first installment, unlike the first-person gameplay of Brothers in Arms 2: Global Front. Player characters can drive Sherman tanks, throw grenades, reload, and shoot using virtual buttons on the touchscreen, and can control various tanks such as the American M4 Sherman  Tank and the Soviet T-34.

Brothers in Arms 3: Sons of War introduces squads which can be upgraded or changed. They also share similar features to Frontline Commando 2, another third-person shooter game developed by Glu Mobile. The customization for this game has been expanded. The player could customize and upgrade their weapon to complement their style of gameplay. Additional weapons such as assault rifles, sniper rifles, shotguns, rocket launchers, pistols and knives can be bought from the shop. The player character can freely move across the level with a cover system. The graphics are improved compared to previous entries in the series.

The game also features side missions in which the player can unlock more weapons. Some enemy soldiers using an anti-air weapon can be found during side missions.

Brothers 
Brothers are soldiers who fight along with the player. Their skills can be upgraded using dogtags or medals. They can be acquired during progress through the campaign missions (the story as Sergeant Wright). Certain Brothers can be acquired by winning VIP Events.

Different brothers have different abilities. For example, James Gann is a sniper and can shoot a particular target asked by the player, or Barnaby Adams who can call an air strike on request. Some brothers also have consumables like Cain Lawrence who has Molotov Cocktails or Larry Jackson who has a bazooka.

These abilities can be used only after a cool down period from the previous use.

Story 

Brothers in Arms 3: Sons of War, just like the previous games, is set during World War II, this time in Normandy, 1944. The game begins with the protagonist, Sergeant Cole Wright, starting a diary of what he experienced of the war. His squad was tasked to assault a forest village located in France, to obtain enemy documents from an occupied manor. While they were able to find the files, one of Wright's brothers, Jacob Hall, was killed by an enemy sniper while escaping the area. Later in the game, he is unusable and his icon shows that he is KIA. A month later, Wright was sent on a rescue mission, to find Rachelle Dubois, known as "L'Hirondelle", a French Resistance fighter from enemy forces. With assistance of his squad mates, Wright was able to rescue "L'Hirondelle" and her team. During the time together, the two fell in love with each other.

Wright then recalls being a part of the assault on Monte Cassino, Italy, back in January. His team was sent in to recover what's left of the failed initial strike team, and complete the mission themselves. In addition, they were tasked to find and eliminate General Karl Herst, the leader of the forces in the area. During the mission, Cole had rescued Cain Lawrence, a member of the original team, but failed to save the others. As the attack went on, Wright had spotted Herst, and tried to pursue, but failed to take out the General. After the rescue of "L'Hirondelle", Wright's squad was ordered to stop an enemy convoy of reinforcements from reaching Falaise, France. Cole's squad disrupts their communications, and diverted the enemy convoy to an ambush point. Wright and his squad was successful in their attack, stopping the convoy from reaching the city.

A few days earlier, Sergeant Wright's squad ordered to infiltrate a Gestapo building in Paris to find information on POW camps for future rescue missions. However, the squad did not find anything, and were forced to retreat from enemy reinforcements. The mission was not a total loss, as they had located and captured General Alder, in order to get the information. Months later, Major Bastion, Wright's Commanding Officer, had told him that Sam Foster, a fellow soldier that rescued him from captivity in 1942, was actually a mole. Wright was captured after being ambush when their intel was bad, and Foster had rescued him. His squad was sent to Belgium, and tracked him down. Wright eventually killed Foster, and had been thinking of what he'd have become, when he did not feel any regret for killing him, even when he saved him.

In February 1945, months after, Sergeant Wright was sent to Trier, Germany to stop a German "Vengeance-Weapon" Program, from inflicting civilian casualties. His squad assaulted the facility, and successfully destroyed the weapons, preventing them from being used. The following month, Bastion had finally tracked down General Herst, the same general that eluded Wright in Monte Cassino. Herst was found heading for Aalborg, Denmark, to a German outpost and bunker. However, Wright and his squad was able to ambush his convoy. Herst however fled to the bunker, but bombers had bombarded it, causing it to fall apart. Wright, not wanting him to escape again, chases in after him. Cole had shot Karl Herst, as he tried to escape the exploding bunker. Outside the bunker, Wright kills the General. However, during his chase, Wright had also sustained wounds, and dies shortly after.

Another soldier was dispatched from Major Bastion to Cherbourg in March 14th 1944, one year before Cole‘s death, he was sent to secure precious stolen pictures from the enemies, but at first he could not believe that he and his squad had to do it. But he promised to secure them. After the explosion of the C4 Mines that were planted to secure the way, he then ambushed through the harbour of the city with his squad, battling trough the troops of the harbour. He then finally secures the pictures with his squad who support him. They got them to the extraction point successfully, and shortly after, they left Cherbourg.

From that point, the official campaign ended. But there is also another free expansion that came later to the game:

1 year before Cherbourg, in March 18th, 1943, this „soldier“ was sent to El Guettar, to occupy El Guettar as there were just some garrison left behind. They managed to hold the city for a couple of days, but on March 23rd, a Counterattack from the Nazis caught them cold, so they thought, that they wouldn’t make it. But a few hours later, after they survived the first wave of the counterattack, they needed to repair the Anti-aircraft warfare as the enemy prior to their attack sabotaged them if they wanted to survive the Airstrike. They have made it through that, but the third wave was never that high as they expected to be, because German Panther tanks had overruned the first defence line, following by Anti-tank soldier’s, (and more) just to destroy the city walls. The soldier then commanded the soldier’s to hold their position, till support arrived, and the German‘s fled.

Development 
The game was announced at E3 2013 by Gameloft and was unveiled as a cross-over of a cover-based shooter and an on-rails shooter. It was revealed that the game will be on Apple devices and iOS. After that release, many more updates followed on, e.g. Multiplayer was added, and then also the North-African campaign „El Guettar“. But after somewhere around 2016 and beyond, there were little to no news and/or development updates on Brothers in Arms 3. In Quartal 4 2022 the game was then removed from all platforms, as Gameloft stated that they wanted to focus on other games and end the active development. It is not downloadable anymore.

Reception 
The game has a score of 60% on Metacritic. TouchArcade awarded it a score of 3.5 out of five, saying "the simple fact that even this review spends so much time on explaining the systems means to me that the game focuses less on gameplay and more on monetization, which is a shame." Pocket Gamer awarded it a score of 5 out of 10, saying: "But with such consistent, nagging, and exhausting requests for my money, I find the whole thing about as much fun as a month in Colditz."

References 

2014 video games
Third-person shooters
IOS games
Android (operating system) games
Multiplayer and single-player video games
Brothers in Arms (video game series)
Gameloft games
Action video games
World War II video games
Video games set in France
Video games developed in France
Video games developed in the United Kingdom
Video games developed in the United States